Arvinder Singh Bubber is the first chancellor of Kwantlen Polytechnic University located in the South Fraser region of British Columbia's Lower Mainland. He was installed as chancellor at Kwantlen's Fall Convocation in October 2008. He is expected  to serve a three-year term through 2011.

Early life
Chancellor Bubber  earned his undergraduate degree in the faculty of science at the University of Punjab. He received his chartered accountant designation after moving to England in 1971. He then moved to Canada in 1976.

References

Canadian university and college chancellors
University of the Punjab alumni
Canadian accountants
English accountants
Year of birth missing (living people)
Place of birth missing (living people)
Academic staff of the Kwantlen Polytechnic University
Living people